The UNESCO-UNEVOC International Centre for Technical and Vocational Education and Training is one of seven UNESCO institutes and centres working in the field of education. The International Centre is located at the United Nations Campus in Bonn, Germany and is financed by both UNESCO and the German government.
UNESCO-UNEVOC is the International Centre for connecting UNESCO Member States worldwide to develop and strengthen technical and vocational education and training (TVET). The Centre works in the context of UNESCO’s mandate for Education for All and Education for Sustainable Development. It undertakes its activities through a global network of TVET institutions comprising departments of ministries, national TVET bodies, Universities, and nationally leading training centers.

History 

In 1989, the United Nations recognized that the “development of technical and vocational education should contribute to the safeguarding of peace and friendly understanding among nations” and was, as such, part of a UN Mandate. In this context, an “International  Project on Technical and Vocational Education” was initiated and the “UNEVOC Network” was officially launched in 1992. The network gathered 185 centers in 126 countries in 1999.

The UNESCO-UNEVOC International Centre was created in 1999 based on the decision of the 30th UNESCO General Conference. A year later, UNESCO and the German government agreed on hosting the International Centre within the Langer Eugen building, the former building for the German members of parliament which now hosts the UN Campus, The new facilities were inaugurated in April 2002. UNEVOC is still hosted and partly financed by the German government.

Mission and activities 

The Centre works in the context of UNESCO’s mandate for Education for All and Education for Sustainable Development. The Centre's official mission is to assist Member States to strengthen and upgrade their TVET systems in order to achieve the "access for all, high quality, relevant and effective programmes and learning opportunities throughout life”.  The third UN international congress on TVET, which was organized in 2012, reinforced the mission and action of UNEVOC by recognizing within its recommendation the importance of "expanding and enhancing the capacities of the UNEVOC network to play a key role in developing the capacities of decision-makers and practitioners, and facilitate the involvement of all stakeholders".
Nowadays, the UNESCO-UNEVOC International Centre links up a Network of 247 Centres in 167 Member States. "UNEVOC Centres" aim to improve TVET in the Member State in which they are located. The International Centre defines itself as a hub facilitating the international collaboration between Centres, experts and stakeholders: In this regard, UNESCO-UNEVOC organizes conferences, workshops, expert meetings in the partner countries or at its premises in Bonn. Those events gather experts and representatives from UNEVOC Centres, UNESCO institutions and other national and international partners
UNESCO-UNEVOC also provides online resources. Publications on TVET are completed by some field-recognized products like "TVETipedia" (an open TVET glossary), a public TVET country profiles database, and the "TVET Forum", an online discussion board for TVET experts. 
Besides its networking and knowledge management activity, the International Centre is known for its contribution to the field of sustainable TVET (also called "Greening TVET") and to the Education For All project.

See also 

UNESCO
Vocational Education

References

External links 
 UNESCO-UNEVOC website
UNESCO: Third international congress on TVET (2012)

UNESCO
Vocational education